Christopher Fehn (born February 24, 1973) is an American musician. He was a percussionist and backing vocalist for the heavy metal band Slipknot from 1998 to 2019, in which he was designated #3. He was also the bassist for Will Haven from 2010 to 2012.

Career

Slipknot 

Fehn grew up in Ankeny, Iowa. Prior to joining Slipknot, he played as a kicker on the Wayne State University football team. Fehn joined the band around August (or September) 1998, replacing percussionist Brandon Darner.

As well as lending his percussion talents to the band, Fehn has also sung backing vocals on a number of songs Slipknot has both recorded and performed live. Fehn describes himself as a "big fan of the band" and says of Slipknot, "the world needed something like this."

In an interview with Face Culture, Fehn stated that the band members gave him a hard time during his early years with the band. He described that his time during the self-titled album era was his "hazing period."

Slipknot bassist Paul Gray stated in an interview that Fehn "often brings humor to the band," and that they "definitely need that guy." Fehn would wear a Pinocchio-style mask and would frequently stroke the nose as if he was masturbating. Prior to joining Slipknot in 1998, Fehn was close friends with Slipknot's percussionist Shawn Crahan. According to Fehn, he had originally asked Crahan if he could be drummer Joey Jordison's drum tech. Shortly after his request was made, Fehn was given an offer to play percussion in the band. Fehn was then given a rough demo that contained all of Slipknot's songs. Fehn has said that "Spit It Out" was the song that stood out to him the most. Fehn then tried out on percussion and was subsequently made part of Slipknot. Of the nine members, Fehn was the eighth to join the band.

His mask was featured in the movie Harold & Kumar Escape from Guantanamo Bay.

He was in the band Will Haven as bassist from 2010 to 2012.

On March 14, 2019, Fehn filed a lawsuit against Slipknot, citing payment being held back. Fehn specifically accused Corey Taylor and Shawn Crahan for what he felt was questionable business dealings.

On March 18, 2019, Fehn officially split with Slipknot following the filing of his lawsuit. However, a few days later, the message was removed from the website and according to Fehn's lawyer, the percussionist's employment status with the band had not changed since his initial filing.

Personal life
In the early years of Slipknot before their signing with Roadrunner Records, Fehn was an electrician.

Outside Slipknot, Fehn is a very keen golfer, and shown on an interview he did on the band's 2006 DVD, Voliminal: Inside the Nine, where he is interviewed at a golf course.

On March 23, 2012, Fehn's son was born.

Fehn has ornithophobia.

Discography

with Slipknot 

 Slipknot (1999)
 Iowa (2001)
 Vol. 3: (The Subliminal Verses) (2004)
 9.0 Live (2005)
 All Hope Is Gone (2008)
 .5: The Gray Chapter (2014)

with Will Haven 
 Voir Dire (2011)

Compilation albums 

 Antennas to Hell (2012)

Filmography
 1999: Welcome to Our Neighborhood
 2000: Slipknot: Generation Z
 2002: Disasterpieces
 2002: Rollerball
 2003: Slipknot: Up to Our Necks
 2006: Voliminal: Inside the Nine
 2008: Nine: The Making of "All Hope Is Gone"
 2009: Of the (sic): Your Nightmares, Our Dreams
 2010: (sic)nesses
 2013: Motionless in White – America 
 2016: Officer Downe 
 2017: Day of the Gusano: Live in Mexico

References

External links

 Slipknot website
 

21st-century American drummers
21st-century American singers
American heavy metal drummers
American heavy metal singers
American male singers
American people of Norwegian descent
Grammy Award winners
Living people
Nu metal drummers
Musicians from Des Moines, Iowa
Roadrunner Records artists
Slipknot (band) members
1973 births